bKash is a mobile financial service in Bangladesh operating under the authority of Bangladesh Bank as a subsidiary of BRAC Bank Limited. This mobile money system service company started as a joint venture between BRAC Bank Limited, Bangladesh Government and Money in Motion LLC, United States of America. As a mobile financial service (MFS) provider in Bangladesh through bKash users can deposit money into their mobile accounts and then access a range of services, in particular transferring and receiving money domestically, making payments. Services like mobile recharge or paying utility bills are also possible through bKash USSD (*247#) and bKash App. A user can receive money from overseas on bKash. In November 2021, bKash became the first ever Unicorn startup (a startup whose valuation is $1 billion or more) company in Bangladesh.

Fortune magazine ranked bKash among the top 50 companies in their Change the World list in 2017. According to Fortune, 22% of Bangladeshi adults use bKash with around 4.5 million daily transactions. Asiamoney magazine declared bKash as the Best Digital Bank (2018). World HRD Congress declared it as one of Asia's best employees in 2017.

History
bKash was launched by Kamal Quadir and Iqbal Quadir. In the mid-2000s, mobile financial services had taken off in the Philippines, Kenya, and other emerging markets when the two Quadir brothers decided to bring it to Bangladesh. In need of a local partner, the Quadir brothers began to engage BRAC's founder, Sir Fazle Hasan Abed, in 2008. Discussions between them and Abed continued over a two-year period. In 2010, they committed to establishing a joint venture between Money in Motion and BRAC Bank. bKash launched in 21 July, 2011 in Bangladesh, with basic services: Cash In, Cash Out and Send Money, keeping in mind that more than 70% of the population of Bangladesh lives in rural areas where access to formal banking services is difficult for people. More user-demanded services like airtime top-up, bills payment, train-movie ticket purchase were introduced over its span. Now it has its own mobile application, it has been recognized as the best innovation at the Financial Innovation Category in Bangladesh Innovation Award 2018 for its simplified and useful features.

bKash started in 2011 as a joint venture between BRAC Bank Limited, Bangladesh, and Money in Motion LLC, United States of America. In April 2013, International Finance Corporation (IFC), a member of the World Bank Group, became an equity partner, in March 2014, Bill & Melinda Gates Foundation became an investor in the company, and in April 2018 Ant Financial, the operators of Alipay (an affiliate company of Chinese giant Alibaba Group), became an equity partner, announced a strategic partnership to promote financial inclusion for the unbanked and underbanked communities in Bangladesh. Later, in November 2021, bKash  announced an investment from SoftBank Vision Fund 2 to promote financial inclusion by building a digital financial ecosystem in Bangladesh.

Board of Directors

Shameran Abed is the chairman. He is a senior director at BRAC. Other members of the bKash board include Ant Group nominees Gouming Cheng and Kai Nin Kenny Man; BRAC Bank nominees Selim R F Hussain, K Mahmood Sattar, Meheriar M. Hasan, Asif Saleh, Fahima Choudhury, and Ryan Gilbert; International Finance Corporation (IFC) nominee Shinya Yoshino; Money in Motion nominee Nicholas Hughes, and SoftBank nominees Jason Park and Chris Lee.

See also
 Nagad

References

Internet properties established in 2011
Payment service providers
Mobile payments
Mobile payments in Bangladesh
Financial services companies established in 2011
Online payments
2011 establishments in Bangladesh